Eric Allen Goldberg (born May 1, 1955) is an American animator, voice actor and film director known for his work at both Walt Disney Animation Studios and Warner Bros. Animation.

Life and career
Goldberg was born and raised in Levittown, Pennsylvania, and moved to Cherry Hill, New Jersey as a child, where he attended Cherry Hill High School East. Goldberg later studied at Pratt Institute, where he majored in illustration. He first entered the industry in the mid-1970s working on Raggedy Ann & Andy: A Musical Adventure for the Richard Williams studio, eventually moving to Williams' London studio and rising through the ranks from assistant to director. During the 1980s, Goldberg started his own London-based studio, Pizazz Pictures, to produce television commercials.

Later, Goldberg closed his studio to work at Disney Animation Studios, Burbank, California, to work on the film Aladdin, for which he became the lead animator on the character Genie, and later the lead animator on Phil in Hercules (1997). Goldberg also was the co-director of Disney's 1995 feature Pocahontas. During his time as the lead animator for the Genie, he also provided the majority of the original animation for MC Skat Kat's "Big Time" music video, which was finished in 1992 but left unaired.

In 1997, Goldberg began plans to produce an animated short set to the music of George Gershwin's Rhapsody in Blue. His film eventually became part of Disney's Fantasia 2000 after Goldberg was allowed to use the Disney staff to complete the film during a production hiatus. He also served as director for Fantasia 2000 "The Carnival of the Animals" segment. Goldberg's wife Susan served as art director on both segments.

Goldberg served as the director of animation for Warner Bros.' 2003 live-action/animation hybrid feature Looney Tunes: Back in Action, and also provided the voices of Bugs Bunny (one line), Marvin the Martian, Tweety, and Speedy Gonzales. Although the film was not commercially successful at the box office, it was met with relatively positive reviews from film critics, and Goldberg was nominated for an Annie Award for Outstanding Directing in an Animated Feature Production for his animation direction. He animated the title sequence of Metro-Goldwyn-Mayer's 2006 remake of The Pink Panther, with Bob Kurtz of Kurtz and Friends.

In 2006, Goldberg returned to Disney, where he directed four minutes of animation for the Epcot attraction Gran Fiesta Tour Starring The Three Caballeros and contributed to the 2007 animated short How to Hook Up Your Home Theater, which starred Goofy. Most recently, he was the supervising animator for Louis in The Princess and the Frog (2009), Rabbit in Winnie the Pooh (2011), and Maui's tattoos in Moana (2016).

Eric has also animated Mickey Mouse on Nighttime Spectaculars in DisneyParks and Resorts, including Disney Gifts Of Christmas And Celebrate! Tokyo Disneyland in Tokyo Disneyland, and "We Love Mickey" Main Street Projection Show in Hong Kong Disneyland.

Awards
1993 Annie Award Outstanding Individual Achievement in the Field of Animation
2000 Annie Award Outstanding Individual Achievement for Character Animation for Fantasia 2000
2000 NCS Division Award Feature Animation for Rhapsody in Blue
2010 Annie Award Character Animation in a Feature Production for The Princess and the Frog
2010 Winsor McCay Award for lifetime achievement in animation.

Filmography

Preservation
Two of Goldberg's early films, For Sale and Good Old Fashioned Cartoon Violence, were preserved by the Academy Film Archive in 2012.

References

External links
 
 Eric Goldberg's first visit to CalArts' Character Animation Program (Fall '05)
 Eric Goldberg's second visit to CalArts' Character Animation Program (Spring '06)
 Animated News' Interview with Goldberg (2005)
 From Script to DVD interview
 Eric Goldberg on Voice Chasers

1955 births
Living people
Animators from New Jersey
Animators from Pennsylvania
American male voice actors
20th-century American Jews
American animated film directors
American animated film producers
Walt Disney Animation Studios people
People from Levittown, Pennsylvania
People from Cherry Hill, New Jersey
Cherry Hill High School East alumni
Pratt Institute alumni
Film directors from Pennsylvania
Film directors from New Jersey
Annie Award winners
Artists from New Jersey
Artists from Pennsylvania
21st-century American Jews